Lucie Yi Is Not a Romantic is a novel written by Malaysian-born and Singapore-based author Lauren Ho.

Reception
Kirkus Reviews called the book a "beautiful exploration of both grief and romance starring a lovably hilarious heroine." Publishers Weekly wrote that "Ho hits her stride in this second act, introducing a larger cast and a meatier plot and peeling back her characters’ layers."

Olivia Ho of The Straits Times rated the book 3 stars out of 5.

References

Singaporean novels
Singaporean romance novels